Samantha Stosur was the defending champion, but chose not to participate.

Yanina Wickmayer won the title, defeating Magda Linette in the final 4–6, 6–3, 6–3.

Seeds

Draw

Finals

Top half

Bottom half

Qualifying

Seeds

Qualifiers

Qualifying draw

First qualifier

Second qualifier

Third qualifier

Fourth qualifier

References
Main Draw
Qualifying Draw

Japan Women's Open
2015 Japan Women's Open